The canton of Montpellier - Castelnau-le-Lez is an administrative division of the Hérault department, southern France. It was created at the French canton reorganisation which came into effect in March 2015. Its seat is in Montpellier.

Composition

It consists of the following communes:
Castelnau-le-Lez
Clapiers
Jacou
Montferrier-sur-Lez
Montpellier (partly)

Councillors

References

Cantons of Hérault